Creations were an Australian Christian hardcore and Christian metal band who primarily played Beatdown Hardcore with Metalcore influences. They come from Sydney, NSW, Australia. The band started making music in 2009. Their first two studio albums, The Gospel and Unworthy/Humility, were released by Mediaskare Records alongside Rite of Passage Music, correspondingly in 2011 and 2013. The band announce they were disbanding in 2016.

Background
Creations were a Christian hardcore and Christian metal band of the melodic deathcore variety, Hailing from Sydney, NSW, Australia, they became a musical entity in 2009. Their final lineup consisted of vocalist Thomas Hirst, guitarist Jared Laycock, bassist Jonny Blackwell, and drummer Mike Mitchell, while their former members were vocalist Michael Foss, guitarists Blake Carter and James Thorpe, and drummer Blair Gowan.

Music history
The band commenced their musical recording careers in 2009. Their first studio album, The Gospel, was released on 30 August 2011 with Mediaskare Records and Rite of Passage Music. Their second studio album, Unworthy/Humility, was released on 11 June 2013, from Mediaskare Records.

Members
Final line-up
 Thomas Hirst – vocals
 Jared Laycock – guitar
 Jonny Blackwell – bass
 Mike Mitchell – drums 
Past members
 Michael Foss – vocals
 Blake Carter – guitar
 James Thorpe – guitar
 Blair Gowan – drums

Discography
Studio albums
 The Gospel (30 August 2011, Mediaskare/Rite of Passage)
 Unworthy/Humility (11 June 2013 Mediaskare)
EPs
 Ruined (2009, Independent)

Singles
 "Boom", originally performed by P.O.D., released on Goes Undercover compilation (2013)

References

External links
 Facebook page

Australian heavy metal musical groups
2009 establishments in Australia
Musical groups established in 2009
Deathcore musical groups
Australian Christian metal musical groups